There Is Only You may refer to:

There Is Only You (album), 2014 album by The Xcerts
"There Is Only You", song by Human Drama from the albums Fourteen Thousand Three Hundred Eighty Four Days Later and Feel (Human Drama album)
"There Is Only You", 1998 song by Christian rock band Smalltown Poets from Listen Closely 
"There Is Only You", song by Roy Rogers (guitarist) from Slideways